The Arkansas–Texas football rivalry is an American college football rivalry between the Arkansas Razorbacks and Texas Longhorns.

History
Texas and Arkansas first met in 1894 in a 54–0 victory by Texas. The two programs have met 79 times and have played many historically notable games, such as the 1964 game in Austin that led to Arkansas's 1964 national title, the 1969 Game of the Century in Fayetteville between #2 Arkansas and #1 Texas, which eventually led to Texas's 1969 national title, the 1981 game in Fayetteville that is the largest margin of victory for an unranked team over the top-ranked team in college football since World War II when Arkansas beat #1 Texas 42–11, and the first game of the 21st century, when Arkansas beat Texas 27–6 in the 2000 Cotton Bowl. Although they have not regularly played each other since Arkansas's move to the Southeastern Conference in 1991, which consequently sent Texas to the Big XII Conference in 1996, many fans consider this an important rivalry. Texas and Arkansas met in the 2014 Texas Bowl, which Arkansas won 31–7. The two teams renewed the rivalry on September 11, 2021, at Fayetteville with Arkansas winning the "welcome to the SEC" game 40–21.

Texas leads the series 56–23. The rivalry is expected to resume on a permanent basis when the Texas Longhorns join the Southeastern Conference, likely in the 2024 season.

Game results

See also  
 List of NCAA college football rivalry games

References

College football rivalries in the United States
Arkansas Razorbacks football
Texas Longhorns football